Princess Barbara d'Ursel de Lobkowicz (30 May 1957 - 13 June 2017) was a Belgian politician who served in the Brussels Parliament.

Biography
A member of the Ursel family, she was a corporate lawyer at the Brussels Bar. She married Stéphane de Lobkowicz also a member of the Brussels Parliament.

A member of DéFI, she was elected to the Brussels Parliament in 2014 and served until her death. As a member of parliament, she was primarily concerned with animal welfare.

Her daughter Ariane de Lobkowicz-d'Ursel was elected to the Brussels Parliament in 2019; in the latter's campaign she indicated that, like her mother, she too was committed to animal welfare.

References

1957 births
Members of the Parliament of the Brussels-Capital Region
DéFI politicians
21st-century Belgian women politicians
21st-century Belgian politicians
Princesses by marriage
Lobkowicz family
Ursel
2017 deaths
Belgian princesses